Quebec (AG) v Canada (AG), also known as the Radio Reference, is a decision of the Judicial Committee of the Privy Council that determined that broadcasting fell within the jurisdiction of the Parliament of Canada under the British North America Act, 1867.

Background

When the British North America Act, 1867 was originally drafted, broadcasting had not yet been invented. By the 1920s, Canada had already entered into international agreements on the subject, and there was intense debate as to which level of government in Canada had jurisdiction to regulate this field. Quebec decided to pose reference questions to its appellate court on the matter, and the federal government decided to preempt that hearing by posing the following questions to the Supreme Court of Canada:

 Has the Parliament of Canada jurisdiction to regulate and control radio communication, including the transmission and reception of signs, signals, pictures and sounds of all kinds by means of Hertzian waves, and including the right to determine the character, use and location of apparatus employed?
 If not, in what particular or particulars or to what extent is the jurisdiction of Parliament limited?

Initial ruling by the Supreme Court of Canada

In a 3–2 decision, the SCC held that radio communication is subject to the legislative jurisdiction of the Dominion Parliament. In his opinion, Anglin C.J.C. supported the statement by Newcombe J. that:

and thus noted:

Therefore, radio broadcasting could not be considered to be a matter of a local or private nature, but more properly fell within the definition of "telegraphs" in Section 92(10).

Smith J. also concurred. In dissenting opinions, Rinfret J. and Lamont J. held that the Parliament of Canada did not have jurisdiction to legislate on the subject of radio communication in every respect. It fell within the primary legislative jurisdiction of the provinces either under property and civil rights or under local works and undertakings of section 92 of the B.N.A. Act, except in cases where the Dominion Parliament has superseding jurisdiction under some of the heads of section 91 and under section 132 (relating to treaties) of the B.N.A. Act.

Appeal to the Privy Council

The Privy Council, in a ruling delivered by Viscount Dunedin, held that the reasoning of the majority at the SCC was correct. He noted the following reasons why the minority opinions failed:

 unlike in the Aeronautics Reference, the treaty power under section 132 was not relevant, as the international agreements in question were not treaties of the British Empire, but only entered into by Canada
 Canada's obligations under its agreements in this field required it to pass legislation that would apply to all the dwellers in Canada
 no distinction can be made between the operation of the transmitting and receiving instruments
 radio broadcasting could be seen to be similar to "telegraphs" and to "other Works and Undertakings connecting the Province with any other or others of the Provinces, or extending beyond the Limits of the Province", both of which are excepted matters reserved to federal jurisdiction under section 92(10)
 as the Section 91 claims were preeminent, it was unnecessary to consider whether broadcasting could fall under property and civil rights or matters of a local or private nature under Section 92

Accordingly, the appeal was dismissed.

Impact

Federal jurisdiction over radio broadcasting was later held to include television broadcasting and cable television systems. However, broadcasting has been held not to include the operations of internet service providers.

The question of whether federal jurisdiction over broadcasting includes control of the content of broadcasting has also been answered by the courts. In Re C.F.R.D. and Attorney-General of Canada et al., Justice Kelly affirmed the federal government's authority to regulate programme content. Chief Justice Laskin delivered the opinion of the Supreme Court in Capital Cities Communications v. CRTC. The Court concluded that programme content regulation is inseparable from regulating the undertaking through which programmes are received and sent on as part of the total enterprise.

It appears, therefore, that the decision handed down in the Radio Reference case has subsequently been interpreted to include federal government authority to regulate all facets of the broadcasting industry, including content. Parliament, through its regulatory agency, has used this power in an attempt to create and maintain a national broadcasting system that would"contribute to the development of national unity and provide for a continuing expression of Canadian identity" The Canadian content regulations are merely one aspect of the means accepted to achieve that end.

References 

Canadian federalism case law
Judicial Committee of the Privy Council cases on appeal from Canada
1932 in Canadian case law
Broadcasting in Canada
Mass media regulation in Canada